This is a partial list of prominent buildings in Buxton, Derbyshire which have been demolished or ruined.

See also 

 Listed buildings in Buxton
 Lost houses of Derbyshire
 Pubs and inns in Buxton

References 

Buildings and structures in Buxton
Lists of buildings and structures in Derbyshire
History of Derbyshire
Buxton